Khusrupur is a town and a notified area in Patna district of Bihar state, India. It is situated at the bank of river the Ganges. It is located on NH-30, 34 kilometers east of Patna. By rail, it is 31 kilometers east of Patna.

There is an ancient temple of Lord Shiva (one of the oldest temples of Shiva) called Baikathpur-Temple situated just 3 kilometers away from the town by road. Its design is a combination of both Hindu and Muslim architectural styles. This temple looks like a temple from front and like a mosque from behind. It is a big and very old temple of Lord Shiva where Shiv and Shiva (Parvati) both are jointly worshiped in one Shivling. According to local people, this temple exist from Mahabharat times and the king Jarasandh (the ruler of Magadh) used to worship this Shivling. Later on it was renovated by Raja Mansingh. Formerly the temple was situated on the southern bank of the Ganges. Now, the Ganges has receded about 5 km north. A saint always remained on a boat in the water of the Ganges. Management has constructed great cemented boat and temple in his memory on the Samadhi of the saint. New tourist, visitors, pilgrims devotees and worshipers are introduced to this as temple of Naiea baba.' Temple premises have adequate arrangement for rituals like marriage ceremony, mundan and other local festivities.

On 1 June 2009, Khusrupur railway station witnessed burning of two trains by a mob protesting the withdrawal of stoppage of trains there.

Places near Khusrupur 
Places near Khusrupur include Baikatpur (3 KM), Haibatpur (3 KM), Bahadurpur (5 KM), Jagmal Bigha (6 KM), Momin Pur (6 KM), Kala Diara (7 KM). Surrounded by Raghopur Block towards North, Nagar Nausa Block towards South, Bakhtiarpur Block towards East, Daniyawan Block towards west, Khusrupur serves as the market hub for places nearby.

Demographics
 India census, Khusrupur had a population of 12,185. Males constitute 53% of the population and females 47%. Khusrupur has an average literacy rate of 54%, lower than the national average of 59.5%: male literacy is 62%, and female literacy is 45%. In Khusrupur, 17% of the population is under 6 years of age.

References

Cities and towns in Patna district
Neighbourhoods in Patna